Forsström is a surname. Notable people with the surname include:

Andreas Forsström (born 1991), Swedish ice hockey player
Eino Forsström (1889–1961), Finnish gymnast
Jani Forsström (born 1986), Finnish ice hockey player
Johan Erik Forsström (1775–1824), Swedish naturalist
Jonny Forsström (1944–2017), Swedish artist
Simon Forsström (born 1989), Swedish golfer
Tua Forsström (born 1947), Finnish writer

Swedish-language surnames